Bobby Cruise (born February 28, 1973) is an American professional wrestling ring announcer best known for his time with Ring of Honor.

Career 
Cruise began his career on the independent circuit in New England in 1994.

Ring of Honor (2003–present) 
He joined Ring of Honor in 2003, assuming the role of Steve Corino's personal ring announcer. He later became the promotions made announcer. In 2018, Cruise also served as ring announcer at All In.

When Tony Khan purchased the company in 2022, Cruise remained as the announcer, making his PPV return at Supercard of Honor XV.

All Elite Wrestling (2022–present) 
Tony Khan announced AEW's purchase of Ring of Honor on March 2, 2022. During the year various Ring of Honor Championships were defended on AEW Dynamite and AEW Rampage, with Cruise being the ring announcer. On April 6, 2022, Cruise made his AEW Dynamite debut, announcing a match between FTR and The Young Bucks.

Championships and accomplishments
New England Pro Wrestling Hall of Fame
Class of 2015

References

External links 
 

Living people
American sports announcers
Professional wrestling announcers
Year of birth missing (living people)